Ferenc Décsey (26 January 1927 – 22 March 2005) was a Hungarian sports shooter. He competed in two events at the 1952 Summer Olympics.

References

External links
 

1927 births
2005 deaths
Hungarian male sport shooters
Olympic shooters of Hungary
Shooters at the 1952 Summer Olympics
People from Salgótarján
Sportspeople from Nógrád County
20th-century Hungarian people